The 2001 Windward Islands Tournament was an international football tournament hosted in Grenada in April 2001.

Group stage

Final table

Results

Third place play-off

Final

External links
competition profile at rsssf.com

Football competitions in Grenada
Windward Islands Tournament